George Washington Blagden (October 3, 1802 – December 17, 1884) was an American clergyman.

Blagden was born in Washington, D. C., October 3, 1802.

He entered Yale College in 1820 and graduated in 1823.  After graduation, he took the three years' course at the Andover Theological Seminary. On December 26, 1827, he was ordained the first pastor of the Congregational Church in Brighton, Mass., then just organized as a result of the prevailing Unitarian controversy. He left this parish to accept a call to the Salem Street (Congregational) Church in Boston, where he was installed, November 3, 1830; and he was dismissed on September 5, 1836, from this engagement, to be installed on the 28th of the same month over the Old South Church, in the same city. He was also a member of the Massachusetts Constitutional Convention in 1853, and from 1854 to 1859 was one of the Board of Overseers of Harvard University, from which institution he had received a doctorate in divinity in 1850, as well as from Union College in 1849. A colleague pastor was settled in 1857. In 1872 he resigned his charge, continuing, however, to be connected with the church as pastor emeritus until his death. In 1883 he removed to New York City, to spend his remaining days in the home of a married daughter, and there he died very suddenly, of heart-disease, December 17, 1884, in his 83rd year.

He married, June 8, 1831, Miriam, younger daughter of the Hon. John Phillips of Boston, who died April 26, 1874. Their children were five sons and three daughters, of whom four sons and a daughter survived him.

References

External links

 George Washington Blagden papers, Union Theological Seminary

1802 births
1884 deaths
Religious leaders from Washington, D.C.
Yale College alumni
Andover Newton Theological School alumni
American Congregationalist ministers
American religious writers
American abolitionists
Congregationalist abolitionists
Harvard Divinity School alumni
19th-century American clergy